Events from the year 1727 in France.

Incumbents 
Monarch: Louis XV

Events

Births
 25 February – Armand-Louis Couperin, composer and keyboard player (d. 1789)
 10 May – Anne Robert Turgot, statesman (d. 1781)
 18 June – Charles-Augustin Vandermonde, physician, writer and editor (d. 1762)
 14 August – Henriette-Anne of France (d. 1752) and Princess Louise-Élisabeth of France (d. 1759), twin daughters of King Louis XV of France

Deaths
 

 4 August – Victor-Maurice, comte de Broglie, French general (b. 1647)

See also

References

1720s in France